Phú Lương is a rural district of Thái Nguyên province in the Northeast region of Vietnam. As of 2003, the district had a population of 106,834. The district covers an area of 369 km². The district capital lies at Đu.

Administrative divisions
Đu, Giang Tiên, Cổ Lũng, Động Đạt, Hợp Thành, Ôn Lương, Phấn Mễ, Phú Đô, Phủ Lý, Sơn Cẩm, Tức Tranh, Vô Tranh, Yên Đổ, Yên Lạc, Yên Ninh, Yên Trạch

References

Districts of Thái Nguyên province
Thái Nguyên province